Trevor Best (born 2 April 1942) is a former Australian rules footballer who played with Carlton in the Victorian Football League (VFL).

Notes

External links 

Trevor Best's profile at Blueseum

1942 births
Carlton Football Club players
Australian rules footballers from Tasmania
North Hobart Football Club players
Living people
Tasmanian Football Hall of Fame inductees